Värtans IK is a Swedish football club located in Stockholm.  The club was formed in 1924.

Background
Since their foundation Värtans IK has participated in the upper and lower divisions of the Swedish football league system.  The club currently plays in Division 5 Stockholm Mellersta which is the seventh tier of Swedish football. They play their home matches at the Hjorthagens IP in Stockholm.

Värtans IK are affiliated to the Stockholms Fotbollförbund.

Season to season

In their early history Värtans IK competed in the following divisions:

In recent seasons Värtans IK have competed in the following divisions:

Attendances

In recent seasons Värtans IK have had the following average attendances:

Footnotes

External links
  Värtans IK – Official Website

Football clubs in Stockholm
Association football clubs established in 1924
1924 establishments in Sweden